is a 1966 Japanese chambara film directed by Kazuo Ikehiro and starring Shintaro Katsu as the blind masseur Zatoichi. It was originally released by the Daiei Motion Picture Company (later acquired by Kadokawa Pictures).

Zatoichi's Pilgrimage is the fourteenth episode in the 26-part film series devoted to the character of Zatoichi. It has also been known as Zatoichi's Ocean Voyage

Plot

Seeking to atone for his violent past, Zatoichi (Katsu) embarks on a pilgrimage to visit the 88 Temples on Shikoku.  On the road, a man (Igawa) attacks Zatoichi but is killed by him. Zatoichi follows the man's horse back to his home.

Cast
 Shintaro Katsu as Zatoichi
 Michiyo Okusu as Okichi
 Isao Yamagata as Boss Tohachi
 Hisashi Igawa as Eigoro
 Masao Mishima as Gonbei
 Kunie Tanaka as storyteller

Production
 Yoshinobu Nishioka - Art director

Reception

Critical response
Thomas Raven, in a review for freakengine, wrote that "[t]his film represents another major step forward for the series.  Director Kazuo Ikehiro's touch is exactly what Ichi's stories need and since this was his third Zatoichi picture, he'd honed his skills to a fine point.  It certainly helps that the script is so crisp, as is the inventive cinematography and art direction.  This is certainly one of the best looking of the first fourteen films."

References

External links

 

Zatoichi's Pilgrimage (1966) review by D. Trull for Lard Biscuit Enterprises 
Zatoichi's Pilgrimage (1966) review by Steve Kopian for Unseen Films (16 February 2014)

Japanese adventure films
1966 films
Zatoichi films
Daiei Film films
Films set in Japan
Films shot in Japan
Films scored by Ichirō Saitō
Films with screenplays by Kaneto Shindo
1960s Japanese films